Jan Marek (December 31, 1979 – September 7, 2011) was a Czech professional ice hockey centre. He was selected by the New York Rangers in the 8th round (243rd overall) of the 2003 NHL Entry Draft.

Playing career
Marek played in the Czech Extraliga for HC Oceláři Třinec and HC Sparta Praha before moving to Russia in 2006. He would play in the Russian Superleague and the Kontinental Hockey League for Metallurg Magnitogorsk, HC CSKA Moscow and Atlant Moscow Oblast. He led the KHL in goals scored in the 2008–09 KHL season with 35. Marek signed with Lokomotiv Yaroslavl for the 2011-12 KHL season but was killed before playing a game for the team.

Death

On September 7, 2011, Marek died when a Yakovlev Yak-42 passenger aircraft, carrying nearly the entire Lokomotiv team, crashed just outside Yaroslavl, Russia. The team was traveling to Minsk to play their opening game of the season against HC Dinamo Minsk, with its coaching staff and prospects. Lokomotiv officials said "everyone from the main roster was on the plane plus four players from the youth team."

Career statistics

Regular season and playoffs

International

See also
List of ice hockey players who died during their playing career

References

External links

1979 births
2011 deaths
Czech ice hockey centres
Czech expatriate ice hockey players in Russia
HC CSKA Moscow players
Metallurg Magnitogorsk players
HC Oceláři Třinec players
HC Sparta Praha players
New York Rangers draft picks
HC Slezan Opava players
People from Jindřichův Hradec
Victims of the Lokomotiv Yaroslavl plane crash
Sportspeople from the South Bohemian Region